1001 Children's Books You Must Read Before You Grow Up is a literary reference book compiled by Julia Eccleshare, children's book editor at Britain's Guardian newspaper. It was published in 2009 by Universe/Rizzoli International.

Contents
Noted for listing a variety of international works, 1001 Children's Books You Must Read Before You Grow Up features stories originally written in a multitude of languages, which includes Japanese, Slovak, Italian, Chinese, Swedish, Russian and Dutch. Among the commentaries, there are reviews from notable figures such as Wayne Mills and Lorraine Orman, as well as some by famous authors, such as Michael Morpurgo, Judy Blume, Lois Lowry, Jamila Gavin, Philip Pullman and 25 others. These appear in a different style from the other reviews by contributors. Along with the reviews, there are short excerpts from some of the books themselves, which appear in bold alongside the review. 1001 Children's Books You Must Read Before You Grow Up is separated by reading level, and each title includes summaries with information on the author as well; each picture book title is accompanied by colourful illustrations. Some of the genres included are fantasy, adventure, history, contemporary life, and others. The preface for 1001 Children's Books You Must Read Before You Grow Up is by children's illustrator and author Quentin Blake and introduction by Julia Eccleshare. There is an index of titles, arranged alphabetically, and an index by author/illustrator, arranged alphabetically too, but by author/illustrator, not by title of book. It is organized by age groups, such as 0–3, 3+, 5+, 8+ and 12+.

 Complete list from 2nd edition (2010) 

Reviews
Julie Just of The New York Times has said of 1001 Children's Books You Must Read Before You Grow Up that the reader will "be grateful to discover or revisit and many more that have been all but forgotten." Similarly, Meghan Cox Gurdon of The Wall Street Journal said that "and, happily, what the Internet taketh, by tempting children away from reading, it giveth back to parents, by making it easy for them to locate obscure books that might be otherwise be impossible to find." Roger Ebert has tweeted about it, saying "with bright pictures and easy prose, this could be the first."

See also1001 Books You Must Read Before You Die1001 Albums You Must Hear Before You Die1001 Movies You Must See Before You Die''

References

External links
Complete list at Listology 
Complete list at LibraryThing
Library holdings of 1001 Children's Books

Top book lists
English non-fiction books
Books about books
2009 non-fiction books
2009 children's books
British children's books